The Nikon Coolpix 7900 is a compact, point-and-shoot digital camera which was manufactured and distributed by Nikon in 2005. It has since been discontinued.

External links 
Nikon Website
Nikon Coolpix Brochure - Autumn & Winter 2005/2006
Digital Camera Resource Page - In Depth Review
dpreview.com review

7900
Cameras introduced in 2005